Maigret and the Old Lady is a detective novel by Belgian writer Georges Simenon, featuring his character inspector Jules Maigret. The novel was written between November 29 to December 8, 1949, in Carmel-by-the-Sea, United States. The book was published the following year by Presses de la Cité.

Translations
The book was translated into English by Robert Brain in 1958 and by Ros Schwartz in 2016 under the title Maigret and the Old Lady.

The first German translation by Hansjürgen Wille and Barbara Klau was published by Kiepenheuer & Witsch in 1954. The new translation by Renate Nickel was published by Diogenes Verlag in 1978.

Reception
In 1958 literature magazine Time and Tide wrote about the novel: "The plot of Maigret and the Old Lady […] might not amount to much if it were handled by another, but Maigret's methods and Simenon's gift for creating and evoking local atmosphere combine to hold the reader captive."

Adaptations
The novel was adapted several times:

In French
1977: Maigret et la dame d'Etretat, with Jean Richard in the lead role;
1995: Maigret et la vieille dame, starring Bruno Cremer;

In English
1960: The Old Lady, starring Rupert Davies;

In Japanese
1978: Keishi to rōfūfu no nazo (警視と老夫婦の謎)), starring Kinya Aikawa;

In Russian
1974: Maigret i staraya dama, starring Boris Tenin.

Bibliography
Maurice Piron, Michel Lemoine, L'Univers de Simenon, guide des romans et nouvelles (1931-1972) de Georges Simenon, Presses de la Cité, 1983, p. 318-319

External links

Maigret at trussel.com

References

1950 Belgian novels
Maigret novels
Novels set in France
Novels set in the 20th century